Madison Taylor may refer to:
Madison Taylor, British singer and model who participated in Star for a Night and Eurovision Song Contest 2004
The Cardcaptors name for the Cardcaptor Sakura character Tomoyo Daidouji

See also
James Madison Taylor, early settler of southeastern Idaho, U.S.A.